Rıdvan Bolatlı  (2 December 1928 – 31 March 2022) was a Turkish professional footballer who played in Turkey for Ankaragücü. He was born in Ankara.

International career
Bolatlı made six appearances for the full Turkey national team, including appearing in three matches at the 1954 FIFA World Cup finals and the 1952 Summer Olympics in Helsinki.

References

External links

1928 births
2022 deaths
Turkish footballers
Association football defenders
Turkey international footballers
Olympic footballers of Turkey
Footballers at the 1952 Summer Olympics
1954 FIFA World Cup players
MKE Ankaragücü footballers
Footballers from Ankara